The Dhallywood film industry--the film industry based in Dhaka, Bangladesh--released four feature films in 1963.



See also

 1963 in Pakistan

Notes
There are numerous minor inconsistencies in transliteration among the sources. Greater discrepancies are as follows:

References

Footnotes

Bibliography

External links
 Bangladeshi films on Internet Movie Database

Film
Bangladesh
Lists of Pakistani Bengali films by year